Cornelia–Putnam Historic District is a national historic district in Ridgewood, Queens, New York.  It includes 87 contributing buildings built between 1907 and 1922.  They consist of two story, flat front brick rowhouse dwellings with one apartment per floor and three story tenements with two apartments per floor.  They are constructed of yellow and amber brick with brownstone trim.

Addresses in the district include:
Putnam Avenue
16-12 to 16-74
Cornelia Street
16-11 to 16-77
16-22 to 16-80

It was listed on the National Register of Historic Places in 1983.

References

Ridgewood, Queens
Historic districts on the National Register of Historic Places in Queens, New York
Historic districts in Queens, New York